Samo Za Tvoje Oči is the seventh studio album by Serbian singer Jelena Karleuša. It was released on December 20, 2002, through BK Sound and in collaboration with Heaven Music.

"Samo za tvoje oči" and "Manijak" were accompanied by music videos, while the rest of the seven songs were also promoted by visuals. Karleuša received the Foreign Breakthrough award at the first Beovizija music festival for the track "Love", which was recorded in English.

Track listing 
Credits adapted from Discogs.

Additional notes
"Samo za tvoje oči", "Pazi se", "Još te volim" and "Zar ne" contain samples of "Gia" (2001), "A Pa Pa" (1999), "Ipofero" (2000) and "To Allo Miso" (1997), respectively, by Despina Vandi.

Personnel
Credits adapted from the album's liner notes

Performers and musicians
Jelena Karleuša – vocals
Marija Mihajlović, Madame Piano, Aleksandar Mitrović and Dimos Beke - backing vocals
Antonis Gounaris – guitar
Phoebus - keyboards and piano
Hakan Singolou - sazi
Manolis Vlachos and Vangelis Siapatis - engineer
Manolis Vlachos - mixing

Release history

References

2002 albums
Jelena Karleuša albums